William McLeod (c. 1860 – 8 November 1943) was a Scottish footballer who played as a full back.

Career
Born in Glasgow, McLeod played club football for Cowlairs, Aston Villa and Queen's Park, and made one appearance for Scotland in 1886. He was later active as a referee.

References

1860 births
1943 deaths
Scottish footballers
Scotland international footballers
Cowlairs F.C. players
Aston Villa F.C. players
Queen's Park F.C. players
Association football fullbacks
Date of birth missing
Place of death missing
FA Cup Final players
Scottish football referees